There are more than 100 gamelan groups in the United States.  A gamelan is a musical ensemble from Indonesia, typically from the islands of Bali or Java, featuring a variety of instruments such as metallophones, xylophones, drums and gongs; bamboo flutes, bowed and plucked strings. Vocalists may also be included. The earliest appearance of a gamelan in the U.S. is considered to be at the World's Columbian Exposition in Chicago in 1893; this set of instruments is still at the Chicago Field Museum. The first academic program to include the playing of gamelan was established by Mantle Hood at UCLA in 1958.

There are actively performing gamelan groups in roughly two thirds of the states in the U.S., using instruments made in the Indonesian regions of Java, Bali, Sunda (West Java), Banyumas, and/or North America. Many schools, universities and other institutions in North America own sets of gamelan instruments, and there are increasing numbers of community-based ensembles as well.

The earliest directory of gamelan in North America was compiled by Barbara Benary in 1993 for Ear Magazine, which included 98 sets (not all with active players); since then the number has increased steadily.

List by state

See also
Gamelan outside Indonesia

References

Notes and bibliography
This list is based on a directory designed and first compiled by Barbara Benary in 1983, and published in a special issue of EAR magazine. A version of that list, still maintained by Benary, is at International Gamelan Directory, hosted by the American Gamelan Institute. That site also contains lists of groups in other countries as well, particularly Japan.
  from the Embassy of the Republic of Indonesia
Diamond, Jody & Benary, Barbara (2001). "Indonesian music In The United States and Canada." . The Garland Encyclopedia Of World Music and Dance Koskoff, Ellen Editor Vol. 3. pp. 1011–1033.

Gamelan